Iqbal Ahmed Saradgi (born 5 June 1944) is an Indian Politician and former member of the 14th Lok Sabha (He represented the Gulbarga constituency of Karnataka)  and former member of Karnataka Legislative Council for the term 2014 to 2020.  He is a member of the Indian National Congress (INC) political party.

Early life and family 
Iqbal Ahmed Saradgi was born to Mohammed Ahmed Saradgi and Gauhar Begam on  5 June 1944 in Gulbarga Karnataka. He obtained his education Bachelor of Arts from Government Arts and Science College, Gulbarga (Karnataka) and LLB (master's and law degrees) from  Law College, Osmania University, Hyderabad (Andhra Pradesh). He is Advocate, Agriculturist and Educationist by profession.

Constituency 
Iqbal Ahmed Saradgi represented Gulbarga (Lok Sabha constituency) in 13th Lok Sabha and 14th Lok Sabha (Lower house).

Established 

 Al-Badar Educational and Charitable Trust at Gulbarga
 Al-Badar Rural Dental College at Gulbarga

Political career 
In the 2009 general elections for the 15th Lok Sabha, the Gulbarga constituency was made as a reserved seat for SCs. Henceforth Saradgi gave the opportunity to Mallikarjun Kharge to contest the election as he belongs to that community. Mallikarjun Kharge won the seat and was Union Minister of Labour and Employment of the Republic of India.

Saradgi is still active in politics and is a senior member of the INC political party.

Position Held

References

External links
 Home page on the Parliament of India's website

1944 births
Indian National Congress politicians from Karnataka
Living people
India MPs 2004–2009
People from Kalaburagi
Lok Sabha members from Karnataka
India MPs 1999–2004